
Year 92 BC was a year of the pre-Julian Roman calendar. At the time it was known as the Year of the Consulship of Pulcher and Perperna (or, less frequently, year 662 Ab urbe condita) and the First Year of Zhenghe. The denomination 92 BC for this year has been used since the early medieval period, when the Anno Domini calendar era became the prevalent method in Europe for naming years.

Events 
 By place 

 Roman Republic 
 Consuls: Gaius Claudius Pulcher and Marcus Perperna.
 In the first diplomatic contact between Rome and Parthia, Sulla meets with a Parthian envoy, resulting in the parties recognizing the Euphrates as a common frontier.
 Sulla repulses Tigranes of Armenia from Cappadocia.
 Gaius Sentius becomes Roman governor of Macedonia. He serves until 88 BC.

Levant 
94 BC Levant earthquake, earthquake mentioned in catalogues of historical earthquakes. An earthquake and a tsunami reportedly affected areas of the Levant, including the modern states of Cyprus, Egypt, Israel, and Syria.

Births

Deaths 
 Antiochus XI Epiphanes, king of the Greek Seleucid Empire, drowned

References